This is a list of law enforcement agencies in the state of Nebraska.

According to the U.S. Bureau of Justice Statistics' 2008 Census of State and Local Law Enforcement Agencies, the state had 225 law enforcement agencies employing 3,765 sworn officers, about 211 for each 100,000 residents.

State agencies
Nebraska Brand Committee
Nebraska Department of Agriculture — responsible for enforcement of the Nebraska Pesticide Act
Nebraska Department of Insurance - Insurance Fraud Prevention Division
Nebraska Department of Motor Vehicles, Driver & Vehicle Records Division, Fraud Investigation Section - "performs investigative work relating to vehicle title and registration fraud, driver's license fraud, and odometer fraud. Motor Vehicle Fraud Investigators are certified Nebraska Law Enforcement Officers commissioned as Deputy State Sheriffs."
Nebraska Department of Revenue
Nebraska Emergency Management Agency - Homeland Security
Nebraska Game and Parks Commission - conservation officers enforce Nebraska wildlife laws
Nebraska Law Enforcement Training Center
Nebraska Public Service Commission - Transportation Investigators
Nebraska State Fire Marshal
Nebraska State Patrol
Nebraska State Racing Commission
University of Nebraska at Kearney Police Department
University of Nebraska at Lincoln Police Department
University of Nebraska at Omaha Police Department

County agencies

Adams County Sheriff's Department
Antelope County Sheriff's Office
Arthur County Sheriff's Office
Banner County Sheriff's Office
Blaine County Sheriff's Office
Boone County Sheriff's Office
Box Butte County Sheriff's Office
Boyd County Sheriff's Office
Brown County Sheriff's Office
Buffalo County Sheriff's Office
Burt County Sheriff's Office
Butler County Sheriff's Office
Cass County Sheriff's Office
Cedar County Sheriff's Office
Chase County Sheriff's Office
Cherry County Sheriff's Office
Cheyenne County Sheriff's Office
Clay County Sheriff's Office
Colfax County Sheriff's Office
Cuming County Sheriff's Office
Custer County Sheriff's Office
Dakota County Sheriff's Office
Dawes County Sheriff's Office
Dawson County Sheriff's Office
Deuel County Sheriff's Office
Dixon County Sheriff's Office
Dodge County Sheriff's Office
Douglas County Sheriff's Office
Dundy County Sheriff's Office
Fillmore County Sheriff's Office
Franklin County Sheriff's Office

Frontier County Sheriff's Office
Furnas County Sheriff's Office
Gage County Sheriff's Office
Garden County Sheriff's Office
Garfield County Sheriff's Office
Gosper County Sheriff's Office
Grant County Sheriff's Office
Greeley County Sheriff's Office
Hall County Sheriff's Office
Hamilton County Sheriff's Office
Harlan County Sheriff's Office
Hayes County Sheriff's Office
Hitchcock County Sheriff's Office
Holt County Sheriff's Office
Hooker County Sheriff's Office
Howard County Sheriff's Office
Jefferson County Sheriff's Office
Johnson County Sheriff's Office
Kearney County Sheriff's Office
Keith County Sheriff's Office
Keya Paha County Sheriff's Office
Kimball County Sheriff's Office
Knox County Sheriff's Office
Lancaster County Sheriff's Office
Lincoln County Sheriff's Office
Logan County Sheriff's Office
Loup County Sheriff's Office
Madison County Sheriff's Office
McPherson County Sheriff's Office
Merrick County Sheriff's Office
Morrill County Sheriff's Office

Nance County Sheriff's Office
Nemaha County Sheriff's Office
Nuckolls County Sheriff's Office
Otoe County Sheriff's Office
Pawnee County Sheriff's Office
Perkins County Sheriff's Office
Phelps County Sheriff's Office
Pierce County Sheriff's Office
Platte County Sheriff's Office
Polk County Sheriff's Office
Red Willow County Sheriff's Office
Richardson County Sheriff's Office
Rock County Sheriff's Office
Saline County Sheriff's Office
Sarpy County Sheriff's Department
Saunders County Sheriff's Office
Scotts Bluff County Sheriff's Office
Seward County Sheriff's Office
Sheridan County Sheriff's Office
Sherman County Sheriff's Office
Sioux County Sheriff's Office
Stanton County Sheriff's Office
Thayer County Sheriff's Office
Thomas County Sheriff's Office
Thurston County Sheriff's Office
Valley County Sheriff's Office
Washington County Sheriff's Office
Wayne County Sheriff's Office
Webster County Sheriff's Office
Wheeler County Sheriff's Office
York County Sheriff's Office

Municipal agencies

Albion Police Department
Alliance Police Department
Ansley Police Department
Ashland Police Department
Atkinson Police Department
Auburn Police Department
Aurora Police Department
Bancroft Police Department
Battle Creek Police Department
Bayard Police Department
Beatrice Police Department
Beemer Police Department
Bellevue Police Department
Bennington Police Department
Blair Police Department
Bloomfield Police Department
Boys Town Police Department
Bridgeport Police Department
Broken Bow Police Department
Burwell Police Department
Callaway Police Department
Cedar Bluffs Police Department
Ceresco Police Department
Chadron Police Department
Clarks Police Department
Coleridge Police Department
Columbus Police Department
Cozad Police Department
Crawford Police Department
Creighton Police Department
Crete Police Department
Crofton Police Department
David City Police Department
Decatur Police Department
Dodge Police Department
Elgin Police Department
Emerson Police Department
Exeter Police Department
Fairbury Police Department
Fairmont Police Department
Falls City Police Department
Franklin Police Department
Fremont Police Department
Friend Police Department
Gering Police Department

Gordon Police Department
Gothenburg Police Department
Grand Island Police Department
Hartington Police Department
Harvard Police Department
Hastings Police Department
Hemingford Police Department
Henderson Police Department
Hildreth Police Department
Holdrege Police Department
Hooper Police Department
Howells Police Department
Humphrey Police Department
Imperial Police Department
Kearney Police Department
Kimball Police Department
La Vista Police Department
Laurel Police Department
Leigh Police Department
Lexington Police Department
Lincoln Police Department
Loomis Police Department
Lyman Police Department
Lyons Police Department
Macy Police Department
Madison Police Department
McCook Police Department
Mead Police Department
Milford Police Department
Minatare Police Department
Minden Police Department
Mitchell Police Department
Morrill Police Department
Nebraska City Police Department
Neligh Police Department
Newcastle Police Department
Newman Grove Police Department
Niobrara Police Department
Norfolk Police Department
North Platte Police Department
Oakland Police Department
Ogallala Police Department
Omaha Police Department
O'Neill Police Department
Ord Police Department

Osmond Police Department
Papillion Police Department
Pierce Police Department
Plainview Police Department
Plattsmouth Police Department
Ponca Police Department
Ralston Police Department
Randolph Police Department
Ravenna Police Department
Saint Edward Police Department
Saint Paul Police Department
Sargent Police Department
Schuyler Police Department
Scottsbluff Police Department
Scribner Police Department
Seward Police Department
Shelton Police Department
Sidney Police Department
Silver Creek Police Department
South Sioux City Police Department
Spalding Police Department
Superior Police Department
Sutton Police Department
Tecumseh Police Department
Tekamah Police Department
Tilden Police Department
Uehling Police Department
Valentine Police Department
Valley Police Department
Verdigre Police Department
Wahoo Police Department
Walthill Police Department
Waterloo Police Department
Wauneta Police Department
Wausa Police Department
Wayne Police Department
Weeping Water Police Department
West Point Police Department
Wilbur Police Department
Winnebago Police Department
Wisner Police Department
Wymore Police Department
York Police Department
Yutan Police Department

Other law enforcement agencies 

Office of the United States Marshal for the District of Nebraska
Federal Bureau of Investigation, Omaha
Federal Protective Services
Immigration and Naturalization Services
Federal Reserve Police
United States Department of Veterans Affairs Police
Department of the Air Force Police

Omaha Airport Police Department 
Union Pacific Police Department
BNSF Police Department 
Omaha Nation Police Department 
Santee Sioux Nation Police Department 
Iowa Tribal Police Department 
Lincoln Airport Authority Police Department 
Metropolitan Community College Police  
University of Nebraska-Lincoln Campus Police 
University of Nebraska-Omaha Campus Police 
University of Nebraska-Kearney Campus Police 
University of Nebraska Medical Center Campus Police

References

Sources 
 Nebraska Criminal Justice Directory - April 2010 edition

Nebraska
Law enforcement agencies of Nebraska
Law Enforcement Agencies